Blackstone Formation may refer to:

 Blackstone Formation, Australia; a Late Triassic formation in Queensland, Australia
 Blackstone Formation, Canada; a Late Cretaceous formation in Alberta, Canada